Christine Island is an island  long which lies  off the south coast of Anvers Island and  southeast of Bonaparte Point. The name of Christine Island was proposed by the United States Antarctic Research Program (USARP) biologist Dietland Müller-Schwarze after his wife Christine Müller-Schwarze, who studied Adélie penguins with him on the island in 1971–1972.

See also
 Composite Antarctic Gazetteer
 List of Antarctic and sub-Antarctic islands
 List of Antarctic islands south of 60° S
 SCAR
 Territorial claims in Antarctica

References

Islands of the Palmer Archipelago